Network flow may refer to:
 Network flow problem
 Flow network
 Traffic flow (computer networking)

See also
 Flow (disambiguation)